The Pirates of Penzance is a 1983 romantic musical comedy film written and directed by Wilford Leach based on Gilbert and Sullivan's 1879 comic opera of the same name. The film, starring Kevin Kline, Angela Lansbury, Linda Ronstadt, George Rose, and Rex Smith, is an adaptation of the 1980 Joseph Papp production of Pirates. The original Broadway cast reprised their roles in the film, except that Lansbury replaced Estelle Parsons as Ruth. The minor roles used British actors miming to their Broadway counterparts. Choreography was by Graciela Daniele. It was produced by Papp and filmed at Shepperton Studios in London.

Plot
In the 1850s, young Frederic was sent in the care of his nursemaid, Ruth, to be apprenticed to a pilot. But she misunderstood her instructions, being hard of hearing, and apprenticed him instead to the Pirate King. Now turning 21 years old, his service is finished, so he decides to leave the Pirates of Penzance. He has a strong "sense of duty" and vows to lead a blameless life and to exterminate the pirates. Ruth wants him to take her with him, but just then he meets some young maidens, the daughters of Major-General Stanley, and realizes that Ruth is "plain and old".

One of the maidens, Mabel, agrees to rescue him from his life of piracy by offering her love, and Frederic accepts. Soon, however, the pirates return and seize the young ladies, planning to marry them. Their father then arrives and lies to the pirates, telling them that he is an orphan. He knows that the pirates are orphans themselves and never attack another orphan; the pirates let him and his daughter go free.

Later, General Stanley wrestles with his conscience, having told a lie. Mabel and Frederic try to cheer him up, and Frederic has engaged the constabulary to help him defeat the pirates. The police arrive, but they turn out to be timid. Then the Pirate King and Ruth find Frederic alone. They have reviewed the fine print on his apprenticeship indenture and have discovered that he is still a pirate because he was born in a leap year on February 29, and he will not be out of his indentures to the pirates until his 21st birthday in 1940. Mabel agrees to wait for Frederic until then.

The Police return and, hearing the pirates approach, they hide. The pirates arrive and seize the still guilt-ridden Major-General. Mabel coaxes police to battle the pirates, but they are quickly defeated. However, the Sergeant of Police calls on the pirates to "yield in Queen Victoria's name". The pirates tearfully do so and release the Major-General, surrendering to the police. However, Ruth reveals that the pirates are all "noblemen who have gone wrong"; the Major-General pardons them and invites them to resume their parliamentary ranks and to marry his beautiful daughters. All ends happily.

Cast
 Kevin Kline as The Pirate King
 Angela Lansbury as Ruth
 Linda Ronstadt as Mabel Stanley
 George Rose as Major-General Stanley
 Rex Smith as Frederic
 Tony Azito as the Police Sergeant
 David Hatton as Samuel
 Stephen Hanan as Samuel's singing voice
 Louise Gold as Edith
 Alexandra Korey as Edith's singing voice
 Teresa Codling as Kate
 Marcie Shaw as Kate's singing voice
 Tilly Vosburgh as Isabel

Musical numbers

 Overture
 Pour, oh Pour the Pirate Sherry – Pirates and Samuel
 When Frederic Was a Little Lad+ – Ruth
 Oh Better Far to Live and Die++ – Pirate King
 Oh False One, You Have Deceived Me – Frederic and Ruth
 Climbing Over Rocky Mountain+ – Major General's Daughters
 Stop, Ladies, Pray – Frederic and Daughters
 Oh Is There Not One Maiden Breast+ – Frederic and Daughters
 Oh Sisters, Deaf to Pity's Name – Mabel and Daughters
 Poor Wandering One++ – Mabel and Daughters
 Stay, We Must Not Lose Our Senses – Frederic, Daughters and Pirates
 Hold Monsters and I Am the Very Model of a Modern Major-General+ – Mabel, Major General and Chorus
 Act I Finale – Company

 Oh Dry the Glistening Tear* – Mabel and Daughters
 When the Foeman Bares His Steel++ – Sergeant of Police
 Now for the Pirate's Lair – Frederic, King and Ruth
 When You Had Left Our Pirate Fold+ – Ruth, King and Frederic
 My Eyes are Fully Open (from Ruddigore) – Frederic, Ruth and King
 Away, Away, My Heart's on Fire – King, with Frederic and Ruth
 Stay, Frederic, Stay – Mabel and Frederic
 Ah, Leave Me Not to Pine – Mabel and Frederic
 Oh Here Is Love and Here Is Truth – Mabel and Frederic
 No, I Am Brave+ and Sergeant, Approach+++ – Mabel, Police and Sergeant
 When a Felon's Not Engaged in His Employment+ – Sergeant and Police
 A Rollicking Band of Pirates, We – Sergeant, Pirates and Police
 With Cat Like Tread++ – Pirates and Police
 Sighing Softly to the River – Major-General and Men
 Act II Finale++ – Company

Differences from the stage version
+Shortened
++Extended
+++Originally dialogue.
Omitted: How Beautifully Blue the Sky

Reception

Box office
Theater owners boycotted The Pirates of Penzance because Universal Pictures released it simultaneously to theaters and to subscription television services SelecTV and ONTV.

The film opened theatrically in the United States on February 18, 1983 and earned $255,496 from 91 venues in its opening weekend, ranking fourteenth in the box office. At the end of its run, the film grossed $694,497. The film was a box office bomb.

Critical reception
Despite its commercial failure, the film received generally positive reviews from critics. Rotten Tomatoes reports an 81% score based on 16 reviews, with an average rating of 7.1/10.

Home media
The film was released on VHS in 1984 and on DVD in 2010.

See also
 The Pirate Movie – 1982 adaptation of the opera starring Christopher Atkins and Kristy McNichol.

References

External links
 
 
 
 
 
 Review at Variety

1983 films
1980s adventure comedy films
1983 romantic comedy films
1980s musical comedy films
American adventure comedy films
American musical comedy films
American romantic comedy films
American romantic musical films
British adventure comedy films
British musical comedy films
British romantic comedy films
Films based on operas
Films based on works by Gilbert and Sullivan
Films set in the 1870s
Pirate films
American swashbuckler films
Films shot at Shepperton Studios
Universal Pictures films
British swashbuckler films
1980s English-language films
1980s American films
1980s British films